I Don't Want to Go Home was the first album by seminal New Jersey rock/R&B band Southside Johnny and the Asbury Jukes.  The work helped establish the basis of the Jersey Shore sound. It was produced and arranged by manager Steven Van Zandt, who also sang, played guitar, wrote the title song, and elicited the contribution of two compositions by Bruce Springsteen, who also wrote the liner notes.

The album features two perennial Jukes standards, Steve Van Zandt's "I Don't Want to Go Home" and "The Fever" by Bruce Springsteen. There were a number of guest artists and duets, a tradition that continued in their next album, This Time It's for Real.  The track "How Come You Treat Me So Bad" features a duet with Lee Dorsey, while "Broke Down Piece of Man" features a duet with Steven Van Zandt, "It Ain't the Meat (It's the Motion)" features a duet with Kenny 'Popeye' Pentifallo, and finally "You Mean So Much To Me" features a duet with Ronnie Spector.

Track listing
 "I Don't Want to Go Home" (Steven Van Zandt) - 3:42
 "Got to Get You Off My Mind" (Solomon Burke, J.B. Moore) - 3:13
 "How Come You Treat Me So Bad" (Steven Van Zandt) - 3:23
 "The Fever" (Bruce Springsteen) - 5:06
 "Broke Down Piece of Man" (Steve Cropper, Joe Shamwell) - 3:28
 "Sweeter Than Honey" (Steven Van Zandt) - 3:33
 "Fanny Mae" (Waymon Glasco, Morris Levy, Clarence L. Lewis) - 3:22
 "It Ain't the Meat (It's the Motion)" (Henry Glover) - 2:46
 "I Choose to Sing the Blues" (Ray Charles, Billie Holiday) - 2:45
 "You Mean So Much to Me" (Bruce Springsteen) - 3:44

Personnel

Musicians
 Southside Johnny – lead vocals, harmonica
 Kenny 'Popeye' Pentifallo – drums, vocals (duet "It Ain't the Meat")
 Kevin Kavanaugh – keyboards, vocals
 Billy Rush – guitar
 Alan Berger  – bass 
 Carlo Novi - tenor saxophone
 Steven Van Zandt – guitar, vocals (duet "Broke Down Piece of Man")
 Clarence Clemons (credited as Selmon T. Sachs) - bass vocals ("The Fever")
 Lee Dorsey - duet vocals ("How Come You Treat Me So Bad")
 Ronnie Spector - duet vocals ("You Mean So Much To Me")
 The Miami Horns:
 Rick Gazda – trumpet (mute solo "It Ain't the Meat")
 Deacon Earl Gardner - trumpet, witness
 Bob Malach - tenor saxophone 
 Louie 'The Lover' Parenti – trombone
 Bill Zacagni - baritone saxophone
 Strings:
 Charles Parker - violin
 Robert Zelnick - violin
 Naomi Anner - violin
 Cathy Tait - violin
 Nardo Poy - viola
 Ken Dreyfus - viola
 Revelation (background vocals on "The Fever"):
 Arnold McCuller
 Arthur Freeman
 Phillip Ballou
 Benny Diggs

Production
 Steven Van Zandt - producer
 Jimmy Iovine - engineer
 Dave Thoener - assistant engineer
 Mitchel Funk - photography
 Paula Scher - designer
 Bud Copeland - stylist

Source:

References

1976 debut albums
Albums produced by Steven Van Zandt
Epic Records albums
Southside Johnny & The Asbury Jukes albums